Stari Trg or Stari trg means "old square" or "old market town" in several South Slavic languages and may refer to:

Kosovo 
, a village in the Municipality of Mitrovica
, a village in the Municipality of Mitrovica

Other
Stari Trg mine, one of the largest lead and zinc mines in Kosovo

Slovenia 
Stari Trg, Ivančna Gorica, a settlement in the Municipality of Ivančna Gorica
Stari Trg, Slovenj Gradec, a settlement in the City Municipality of Slovenj Gradec
Stari Trg, Trebnje, a former settlement in the Municipality of Trebnje
Stari Trg ob Kolpi, a settlement in the Municipality of Črnomelj

See also 
TRG (disambiguation)